The 2011–12 Lega Pro Prima Divisione season will be the thirty-fourth football league season of Italian Lega Pro Prima Divisione since its establishment in 1978, and the fourth since the renaming from Serie C to Lega Pro.

It will be divided into two phases: the regular season, and the playoff phase.

The league should also be composed of 36 teams divided into two divisions of 18 teams each.

Teams finishing first in the regular season, plus one team winning the playoff round from each division will be promoted to Serie B; teams finishing last in the regular season, plus two relegation playoff losers from each division will be relegated to Lega Pro Seconda Divisione. In all, four teams will be promoted to Serie B, and six teams will be relegated to Lega Pro Seconda Divisione.

Events

Start of the season
On 12 July Gela, Lucchese and Salernitana do not appeal against the exclusion of Covisoc and relegated to Serie D or lower.

On 18 July 2011 the Federal Council excluded Atletico Roma and Ravenna. Both clubs announced appeals to the Olympic Committee against the decision.

The final composition of the rounds was announced 4 August 2011. The five vacancies created were filled by the following teams, all of which were destined to play in Lega Pro Seconda Divisione for the 2011–12 season before the call-up:
Südtirol, which finished 17th in Prima Divisione 2010-11 - Girone A, originally relegated for losing in the playouts.
Ternana, which finished 15th in Prima Divisione 2010-11 - Girone A, originally relegated for losing in the playouts.
Pro Vercelli, which finished 3rd and lost in the playoff final in Seconda Divisione 2010-11 - Girone A
Prato, which finished 3rd and lost in the playoff final in Seconda Divisione 2010-11 - Girone B
Avellino, which finished 4th and lost in the playoff final in Seconda Divisione 2010-11 - Girone C

On 9 August 2011 Alessandria relegated to the last place by Italian national disciplinary committee for match fixing. Monza remained in the league in its place.

Winter champions 
The winter champions were Ternana in Group A and Siracusa in Group B.

Girone A

Teams

League table

Results

Play-offs

Promotion
Semifinals
First legs scheduled 20 May 2012; return legs scheduled 27 May 2012

Final
First leg scheduled 3 June 2012; return leg scheduled 10 June 2012

Pro Vercelli promoted to Serie B.

Relegation
First legs scheduled 20 May 2012; return legs scheduled 27 May 2012

Girone B

Teams

League table

Results

Play-offs

Promotion
Semifinals
First legs scheduled 20 May 2012; return legs scheduled 27 May 2012

Final
First leg scheduled 3 June 2012; return leg scheduled 10 June 2012

Virtus Lanciano promoted to Serie B.

Relegation
First legs scheduled 20 May 2012; return legs scheduled 27 May 2012

Supercoppa di Lega di Prima Divisione

Notes

2011-12
3
Ita